Shinji Morimoto (Morimoto Shinji, born 2 May 1973) is a Japanese politician of the Constitutional Democratic Party, who has served in the House of Councillors (the upper house of the Diet) since 2013.

Early life 
Morimoto was born in Hiroshima Prefecture on May 2, 1973. He graduated from the Department of Social Welfare of Doshisha University in Kyoto in 1997. That same year he joined the Matsushita Institute of Government and Management, a leadership academy founded by Konosuke Matsuhita, the founder of Panasonic. He found work as a secretary in a Law Office in 1999. In 2003, He was elected to the Hiroshima City Assembly and served until his election to the House of Councillors in 2013.

Political career 
Morimoto is a member of the following House committees:

 Committee on Economy and Industry
 Committee on Rules and Administration (Director)
 Special Committee on Official Development Assistance and Related Matters (Director)

References 

Japanese politicians
1973 births
Living people
Constitutional Democratic Party of Japan politicians
People from Hiroshima
Doshisha University alumni
Members of the House of Councillors (Japan)